Matthew Sanchez (born August 4, 1994) is a professional soccer player who plays as a goalkeeper. Born in the United States, he represented Puerto Rico at international level.

Career

College
Sánchez began his college career at Old Dominion. From 2014 to 2016, he played with Loyola Greyhounds, earning numerous honours including Patriot League Goalkeeper of the Year award in 2016.

Professional
In January 2017, Sánchez was chosen to participate in the MLS side D.C. United preseasons trial.

In January 2018, Sánchez signed with USL side Rio Grande Valley FC Toros.

International
Sánchez was called up for the Puerto Rico U20 national team in 2012. They played as U19 team at the 2012 Dallas Cup months before the World Cup Qualifiers in July 2012. He helped Puerto Rico reach the CONCACAF U20 Championship for the first time.

In 2015, Sánchez made his first appearance with the Puerto Rico Senior national football team in a friendly match against Canada. He also represented Puerto Rico in the U23 national team for the 2016 Olympics Qualification Tournament.

References

1994 births
Living people
American soccer players
Association football goalkeepers
Loyola Greyhounds men's soccer players
Old Dominion Monarchs men's soccer players
People from Owings Mills, Maryland
Puerto Rican footballers
Puerto Rico international footballers
Rio Grande Valley FC Toros players